Ace Authentic, based in Duluth, Georgia, manufactures tennis trading cards and memorabilia, and sells other items such as photographs and posters. They have partnered with more than 350 active tennis players and legends to provide items, such as autographs and game worn material, not found through other dealers.

Ace Authentic entered the trading card market in 2005.

Trading card products

References

External links
Official site

Manufacturing companies based in Georgia (U.S. state)
Companies based in Duluth, Georgia